Monte Carmelo is a Brazilian municipality located in the northwest of the state of Minas Gerais. The city belongs to the mesoregion of Triângulo Mineiro e Alto Paranaiba and to the microregion of Patrocínio. It became a municipality in 1840.

Location
The municipality is located in the region of the Alto Paranaíba, south of the Paranaíba River and west of the Emborcação Reservoir. Neighboring municipalities are: Catalão (N), Monte Carmelo (E), Coromandel (S), and Douradoquara (W).

Geography
The municipal seat is located at an elevation of 864 meters.  The highest point in the municipality is Cabeceira Córrego Rancharia at 1,343 meters, while the lowest point is Foz Córrego Francos at 724 meters.

Climate
Yearly average: 
Yearly average maximum: 
Yearly average minimum: 
Yearly average rainfall index:

Distances
Abadia dos Dourados: 
BR-365: 
Patrocínio: 
Uberlândia: 
Belo Horizonte: 
Brasília:

History
The first European settlers came in 1840 in search of diamonds.  A rich landowner, Dona Clara Chaves, donated land measuring six square leagues to the new settlers to build a chapel dedicated to Our Lady of Carmo.  The first settlement was called Arraial do Carmo da Bagagem”.
In 1882, it was elevated to the category of district and was called  “Nossa Senhora do Carmo da Bagagem”.  In 1892 it became a vila (city) and in 1900 the name was changed to Monte Carmelo, after the mountain near Haifa.

Economic activities
The most important economic activities are cattle raising, commerce, and agriculture. The GDP in 2005 was R$400 million, with 230 million generated by services, 36 million generated by industry, and 95 million generated by agriculture. Monte Carmelo is in the top tier of municipalities in the state with regard to economic and social development. , there were five banking agencies in the town.  There was a well-developed retail infrastructure serving the surrounding area of cattle and agricultural lands. There were 8,603 automobiles in all of the municipality (2007), about one for every five inhabitants.

There are three dairy industries with production of cheese and liquid yogurt.  There are seven industries producing spices.  There are two coffee processing industries.  Other industries produce furniture, textiles, chemical products, and soap.  Monte Carmelo is considered the capital of the roof tile due to the number of ceramic industries.  Tiles are shipped to all the regions of the country.  There are also traditional handicraft workshops producing clay pots and water filters.

Monte Carmelo has a large portion of its economy based on agriculture and livestock raising.  In the rural area there were 1,391 establishments (2006) occupying  (planted area—, and natural pasture—).  About 9,000 persons were dependent on agriculture with 6,500 workers hired by farms. 400 of the farms had tractors, a ratio of one in three farms.  There were 53,000 head of cattle in 2006, half of which were milk cows.  There is a well-developed poultry raising sector producing two million chickens a year and one million seven hundred thousand turkeys a year.
The main crops were:
coffee:  with 45 million trees 
avocado: 
rubber: 
passion fruit: 
rice: 
beans: 
corn: 
soybeans: 
sorghum:

Health and education
In the health sector there were 21 health clinics and 04 hospitals with 116 beds.  In the educational sector there were 22 pre-primary schools, 21 primary schools, and four middle schools.

There was one institute of higher learning, the private Faculdade de Ciências Humanas e Sociais - FUCAMP, offering courses in Administration
Business Administration, Biological Sciences, Humanities, English, and Pedagogy.  This school was created in 1997 with financing from the local city government.

Municipal Human Development Index: 0.768 (2000)
State ranking: 180 out of 853 municipalities as of 2000
National ranking: 1,384 out of 5,138 municipalities as of 2000
Literacy rate: 90%
Life expectancy: 71 (average of males and females)
 GDP per capita: R$14.794,50 (IBGE/2008)
Mayor: Fausto Reis Nogueira (PT - 2013–2016)

The highest ranking municipality in Minas Gerais in 2000 was Poços de Caldas with 0.841, while the lowest was Setubinha with 0.568.  Nationally the highest was São Caetano do Sul in São Paulo with 0.919, while the lowest was Setubinha.  In more recent statistics (considering 5,507 municipalities) Manari in the state of Pernambuco has the lowest rating in the country—0,467—putting it in last place.

Notable people
 Mário Palmério, former politician

See also
 List of municipalities in Minas Gerais

References

montecarmelo.mg.gov.br

Municipalities in Minas Gerais